Cristina Castro is a Democratic member of the Illinois Senate who took office in January 2017. Castro represents the 22nd district, which includes all or portions of Elgin, Barrington Hills, Carpentersville, East Dundee and South Elgin, Streamwood, Hoffman Estates, Hanover Park, Schaumburg, and Bartlett.

Prior to her election to the Illinois Senate, Castro was a member of the Kane County Board and Illinois Housing Development Authority. Castro, an Elgin resident, has a Bachelor of Science and a Master of Business Administration from Northern Illinois University.

In 2018, J.B. Pritzker appointed Castro a member of the gubernatorial transition's Job Creation and Economic Opportunity Committee.

As of July 2022, Senator Castro is a member of the following Illinois Senate committees:

 Appropriations - Business Regulations and Labor Committee (SAPP-SBRL)
 Appropriations - Revenue and Finance Committee (SARP-SARF)
 Commerce Committee (SCOM)
 Energy and Public Utilities Committee (SENE)
 (Chairwoman of) Executive Committee (SEXC)
 (Chairwoman of) Executive - Cannabis Committee (SEXC-SEOC)
 Healthcare Access and Availability Committee (SHAA)
 Insurance Committee (SINS)
 Labor Committee (SLAB)
 Redistricting Committee (SRED)
 Redistricting - Kane and Kendall Counties (SDKK)

References

External links

Living people
Year of birth missing (living people)
People from Elgin, Illinois
Northern Illinois University alumni
Democratic Party Illinois state senators
Women state legislators in Illinois
County board members in Illinois
Hispanic and Latino American state legislators in Illinois
21st-century American politicians
21st-century American women politicians